This is a list of the main career statistics of Croatian tennis player Donna Vekić who got more recognized for her results in singles events. Her breakthrough came in 2019 when she reached her first quarterfinal at a Grand Slam championship, at the US Open what brought her in the top 20 of the WTA rankings. In her prize collection, she has three WTA Tour singles titles, as well as five singles titles and one doubles title on the ITF Circuit. In addition, she has played one Premier-level tournament, the 2019 St. Petersburg Ladies' Trophy, as the biggest final of her career. She also has played in national competitions for Croatia including Fed Cup and Olympic Games. At the 2020 Tokyo Olympics, she made her biggest win so far, defeating world No. 3, Aryna Sabalenka. She used to be Croatian number one a couple of times.

Performance timelines

Only main-draw results in WTA Tour, Grand Slam tournaments, Fed Cup/Billie Jean King Cup and Olympic Games are included in win–loss records.

Singles
Current after the 2023 Indian Wells Open.

Doubles
Current after the 2023 Australian Open.

WTA career finals

Singles: 11 (4 titles, 7 runner-ups)

ITF Circuit finals

Singles: 13 (5 titles, 8 runner–ups)

Doubles: 1 (title)

Fed Cup/Billie Jean King Cup participation
Current in 2022.

Singles (13–7)

Doubles (3–1)

United Cup participation

Singles (3–0)

WTA Tour career earnings
Current through the 2022 Tallinn Open.
{|cellpadding=3 cellspacing=0 border=1 style=border:#aaa;solid:1px;border-collapse:collapse;text-align:center;
|-style=background:#eee;font-weight:bold
|width="90"|Year
|width="100"|Grand Slam <br/ >singles titles|width="100"|WTA <br/ >singles titles
|width="100"|Total <br/ >singles titles
|width="120"|Earnings ($)
|width="100"|Money list rank
|-
|2014
|0
|1
|1
| align="right" |325,466
|95
|-
|2015
|0
|0
|0
| align="right" |240,387
|119
|-
|2016
|0
|0
|0
| align="right" |243,988
|120
|-
|2017
|0
|1
|1
| align="right" |574,399
|59
|-
|2018
|0
|0
|0
| align="right" |830,793
|46
|-
|2019
|0
|0
|0
| align="right" |1,534,830
|26
|-
|2020
|0
|0
|0
| align="right" |450,884
|47
|-
|2021
|0
|1
|1
| align="right" |571,182
|64
|-
|2022
|0
|0
|0
| align="right" |379,228
|123
|- style="font-weight:bold;"
|Career
|0
|3
|3
| align="right" |5,448,690
|119
|}

Grand Slam statistics
Seedings
The tournaments won by Vekić are in boldface', and advanced into finals by Vekić are in italics.Record against top 10 playersVekić's record against players who have been ranked in the top 10. Active players are in boldface.''

Top-10 wins

Notes

References

Vekić, Donna